José Abelardo Gutiérrez Alanya (24 September 1957 – 10 March 2023), known by his stage name Tongo, was a Peruvian singer and entertainer. He began his music career in 1980 as a singer of Peruvian cumbia, a type of popular music. Tongo was largely unknown outside of his musical niche (traditionally of the lower class) until his song "La pituca", whose theme focuses on social status and inequality, attained national notability at the start of the twenty-first century. In 2010, Peruvian newspaper El Comercio listed Tongo as one of the most popular artists in Peruvian show business.

Background
An important part of Tongo's success has been his amiable relationship with the Peruvian mainstream media and willingness to use his popularity towards commercial advertisements and political campaigns. His tumultuous friendship with Emmy Award-winning writer and journalist Jaime Bayly proved particularly crucial for Tongo's rise to fame, as he became a regular guest in Bayly's television program in Peru. In the realm of politics, aside from promoting Bayly's election to the presidency with the song "Jaime para presidente", Tongo unsuccessfully ran for Congress in 2005 and caused controversy (and a strain in his friendship with Bayly) when he participated in Lourdes Flores Nano's 2010 campaign for the mayorship of Lima.

Tongo's national stardom reached its peak in 2008, when he released a purposely goofy English version of "La pituca". The song, notorious for its orthographical errors and erroneous verse translations, surpassed the popularity of the original and even became a YouTube hit. Since then, he has continued to entice the public with intentionally comedic cover versions of mainstream songs, including "Ai Se Eu Te Pego",  Justin Bieber's "Baby", Psy's "Gangnam Style", Foster the People’s “Pumped up Kicks”, System of a Down’s “Chop Suey” and Linkin Park's "Numb". He later went on to cover Eminem's "Rap God", Michael Jackson's "Billie Jean" (Bili Yin) and Eagles's "Hotel California".

Musical career

2010–2016 
In 2011, after a few years without recording any new major hits, Tongo made a cover version for The Beatles' song "Let it Be". Under the title of "Lady bi", the song was Tongo's first cover version of a song in English. That same year he performed it at Peru's Teleton. Nonetheless, Tongo's major success for 2011 was his cover version of the popular Justin Bieber song "Baby". The cover became an instant internet sensation, and aided in Tongo's return to major popular music venues in Peru. In October of that year, Latin Grammy-award-winning singer-songwriter Gian Marco Zignago in a light-hearted Facebook message congratulated the singer for his new hit cover (Spanish: "Ayyyy! Tongo, Tongo, Tongo! tú eres el único en este planeta que puede hacer este tipo de cosas! jajajajaja! un éxito!! jajajajaja!"). Both songs followed the trend of "La pituca (en Ingles)" in that they deliberately used verbally incorrect English. He also dedicated a song to the Pisco Sour amidst celebrations for the cocktail's national holiday.

2017 YouTube Covers 
In late 2016, Tongo performed a cover of "Chop Suey" by System of a Down, which received attention from other YouTube Channels and media. Tongo subsequently covered Linkin Park's "Numb". During Linkin Park's One More Light Tour visit to Peru, Mike Shinoda reacted to the song by joking "Oh my God! That's amazing! This is fantastic! I love this (...) Can we put that? That's amazing, like, end of the show's music?" Two weeks later, Shinoda shared the song through his Twitter account.

On 20 July 2017, following Chester Bennington's death, Tongo announced he will honor his memory by making a cover of "In the End". The cover was released on 27 August 2017.

2020 TikTok Emergence 
In May 2020, Tongo uploaded a video to YouTube titled "TONGO EN TIK TOK. BUSCAME COMO TONGO PERÚ." He uploaded his first video to TikTok on 14 May 2020, under the username "tongoperu." He has since amassed over 78,000 followers and has uploaded new videos to the platform almost every day.

Personal life 
In 2010, Jaime Bayly announced that he would make Tongo the godfather of his third child. The singer reacted positively to the announcement and, proclaiming himself an oracle, predicted the child would be a male and future player of Sporting Cristal.

Tongo lived in Miraflores District, Lima. He died from kidney failure complicated by diabetes on 10 March 2023, at the age of 65.

References

External Links
 
 

1957 births
2023 deaths
21st-century Peruvian male singers
21st-century Peruvian singers
Peruvian singer-songwriters
People from Junín Region
Peruvian composers
Peruvian YouTubers